Wayne Lineburg (born January 12, 1974) was the interim head coach of the Richmond Spiders college football team, representing the University of Richmond, for the 2011 season.  He was named to the position on August 23, 2011 following the resignation of Latrell Scott. Before taking the head coaching position at Richmond, Lineburg served as the offensive coordinator and running backs coach for one season at Richmond under Scott.  He had also previously served as the offensive coordinator and running backs coach at Richmond under Dave Clawson from 2004 through 2006.  Lineburg has also held coaching positions at the University of Virginia and the College of William & Mary.

Head coaching record

References

External links
 Connecticut profile
 Richmond profile

1974 births
Living people
American football quarterbacks
UConn Huskies football coaches
Richmond Spiders football coaches
Virginia Cavaliers football coaches
Virginia Cavaliers football players
William & Mary Tribe football coaches
College of William & Mary alumni 
People from Radford, Virginia